The Maas-Wupper-Express (RE 13) is a Regional-Express service in the German state of North Rhine-Westphalia (NRW), running from the Dutch border town of Venlo to Hamm in Westphalia.

Route

Together with the Wupper-Express (RE 4) and Rhine-Ruhr S-Bahn line S 8, the Maas-Wupper-Express provides an east-west link between the lower Rhine of Germany and the eastern Ruhr.

It runs on the tracks of the  Venlo–Viersen, Viersen-Mönchengladbach, Mönchengladbach–Düsseldorf, Düsseldorf–Wuppertal, Wuppertal–Hagen and Hagen–Hamm lines.

Trains running between Venlo and Hamm have to reverse in Mönchengladbach Hauptbahnhof, so the Maas-Wupper-Express is scheduled to spend nine minutes there on the way to Venlo and ten minutes towards Hamm.

In 2026 the current route will be extend towards the central station  of the Dutch city Eindhoven, also stopping at Helmond, in a joint exploitation with Arriva Netherlands

Operations 

The operator of the line is Eurobahn, a subsidiary of Keolis. Operations on this line and the Rhein-Emscher-Express are carried out using 4 four-carriage and 14 five-carriage Stadler FLIRT electrical multiple units with a top speed of 160 km/h rented from Angel Trains. Services run every hour.

Notes

See also

 List of regional rail lines in North Rhine-Westphalia
 List of scheduled railway routes in Germany

External links 

 
 

Rail services in North Rhine-Westphalia